Happy Valley is a locality in the Local Government Area of the Golden Plains Shire. It shares the same name with Happy Valley in Northern Victoria.

History 
Gold was discovered in the area, originally called "Wardy Yallock" (thought to have meant "winding yellow river" of Aboriginal origins) in 1849 as part of the Australian gold rushes, with intensive mining beginning in 1853. Mining Continued until the 1900s. The naming comes from the amount of gold found in the area.

Demographics

References

Towns in Victoria (Australia)
Golden Plains Shire
Ghost towns in Victoria (Australia)